György Dénes (2 July 1898 – 14 April 1962) was a Hungarian stage and film actor. He appeared in more than forty films during his career.

Selected filmography
 Everything for the Woman (1934)
 St. Peter's Umbrella (1935)
 Half-Rate Honeymoon (1936)
 Renee XIV (1946)
 The State Department Store (1953)

References

Bibliography
 Hartmut Gagelmann. Nicolae Bretan, His Life, His Music, Volume 1. Pendragon Press, 2000.

External links

1898 births
1962 deaths
Hungarian male film actors
Male actors from Budapest